Peter Kušnirák (born 1974) is a Slovak astronomer, discoverer of minor planets, and a prolific photometrist of light-curves at Ondřejov Observatory in the Czech Republic. He was married to Slovak astronomer Ulrika Babiaková with whom he discovered 123647 Tomáško, named after their son Tomáško.

He was the principal observer to discover that the two main-belt asteroids 3073 Kursk and 5481 Kiuchi are in fact binary asteroids. In 1999, he discovered the Eunomian main-belt asteroid 24260 Kriváň, which he named after one Slovakia's national symbols, as well as 21656 Knuth and 20256 Adolfneckař, both located in the Aquarius constellation at the time. He is based out of numerous observatories in the Czech Republic, including the Ondřejov Observatory, and works solo or with partners.

The Flora asteroid 17260 Kušnirák, discovered by the U.S. LINEAR project at Lincoln Lab's ETS in 2000, is named in his honor.

List of discovered minor planets

References

External links 
 Collaborative Asteroid Lightcurve Link, list of references for light-curve photometry by Peter Kušnirák

1974 births
20th-century astronomers
Discoverers of asteroids

Living people
Slovak astronomers